Unun can refer to:
 Unun (transformer) - transfers signal from one unbalanced line to another.
 Unun (band)
 unun- - prefix for elements from number 110, that has not yet got a proper name.